Pavlo Rizanenko (born July 12, 1975, in Krasylivka village, Brovary District, Kyiv Region, Ukraine)  -  Ukrainian activist, public figure, Member of Parliament of Ukraine of  7th and 8th convocations, former deputy of Brovary City Council of  6th convocation. In the 2019 Ukrainian parliamentary election he was not reelected.

Education
In 1992, Rizanenko graduated from Brovary High School No. 2 with Silver Medal distinction.

After graduating from high school, Rizanenko attended Kyiv Trade and Economic Institute (KTEI) from 1992 to 1994. He studied at the Faculty of Economics and Management with the specialization in International Business and Entrepreneurship.

In 1994, Rizanenko won student competition and got a NAFSA/USAID grant for study at Graceland College (Lamoni, IA) in the USA.

In 1996 Pavlo Rizanenko graduated from the Graceland College with a BA degree with double major "Economics" and "Business Administration" (double concentration in Corporate Finance and International Business).

In 2001 Rizanenko successfully passed the exams and received Chartered Financial Analyst (CFA) professional designation.

In 2016 Rizanenko obtained Master of Banking degree from the University of Banking (Kyiv, Ukraine).

Career
Rizanenko started his career in 1996 as an auditor at Ukrainian office of Ernst & Young - international audit firm. Two years he was promoted to senior auditor.

From 1999 to 2005 Rizanenko lived in Moscow and worked at the local investment company Troika Dialog. He started as a consultant and worked his way up to become a director of investment banking division.

From 2005 to 2007 Rizanenko worked at Renaissance Capital Investment Company (Russian Federation) as a director of the investment and banking department responsible for the mining and metals sector.

From 2005 to 2006 Rizanenko was a board member of the VSMPO-AVISMA Corporation (Russian Federation) - the international leader of the production of titanium and its products for the global aerospace industry.

Public activity
Since November, 2011 Rizanenko is a chairman of NGO "Transparent Society" (Brovary, Kyiv region).

Since January, 2012 Rizanenko is a chairman of ”Kyiv Regional NGO "Civil protection of Kyiv region”.

Political activity
In October 2010 Rizanenko was elected as a deputy of the Brovary City Council of the VI convocation in the constituency No. 20. He did not belong to any party or faction. As a deputy, Rizanenko concentrated his activities on counteracting the illegal alienation of the land and the thefts of communal property. He was in opposition to the city authorities and the Brovary City Council officials.

On August 1, 2012, Rizanenko was approved to become a candidate for a Member of Parliament from UDAR (Ukrainian Democratic Alliance for Reforms) party on No. 97 Constituency. Rizanenko won the 2012 Ukrainian parliamentary elections in District 97 with 31.04% of the votes and became a Member of Parliament (the Verkhovna Rada) of 7th convocation.

On December 25, 2012, Pavlo Rizanenko became a Deputy Chairman of Special Commission of the Verkhovna Rada of Ukraine on Privatization and a member of the Committee of the Verkhovna Rada on issues of budget.
On March 14, 2014, Rizanenko became a co-chair of an inter-faction union "The Platform of Reforms".

On November 25, 2014 - Rizanenko became an MP of Ukraine of VIII convocation, elected in the 2014 Ukrainian parliamentary election in single-mandate electoral district No. 97 for the party Petro Poroshenko Bloc; this time with 34.11% of the votes. In Verkhovna Rada of Ukraine Rizanenko was a member of the parliamentary faction “Petro Poroshenko Bloc”.

Since February 13, 2015 Rizanenko is the Deputy Chairman of Special control Commission of the Verkhovna Rada of Ukraine on Privatization and Chairman of the Subcommittee on securities, stock market, activities of rating agencies and e-Commerce Committee of the Verkhovna Rada of Ukraine Committee on financial policy and banking.

In February, 2015 Rizanenko became a member of the Inter-factional association "Euro-optimists".

Rizanenko took part in the July 2019 Ukrainian parliamentary election in an electoral district for the party Voice. But lost his electoral district in Brovary (Kyiv Oblast), gaining third place with 9.82% of the votes.

References

1975 births
Living people
People from Kyiv Oblast
Kyiv National University of Trade and Economics alumni
Seventh convocation members of the Verkhovna Rada
Eighth convocation members of the Verkhovna Rada
Ukrainian Democratic Alliance for Reform politicians
Independent politicians of Petro Poroshenko Bloc
Voice (Ukrainian political party) politicians
CFA charterholders
Ernst & Young people
Graceland University alumni